The 2008 Georgia Tech Yellow Jackets football team represented the Georgia Institute of Technology in the 2008 NCAA Division I FBS football season. The team's coach is former Navy Midshipmen and Georgia Southern Eagles coach Paul Johnson. Georgia Tech plays their home games at Bobby Dodd Stadium in Atlanta, Georgia.

Previous seasons
Georgia Tech continued its 11-year bowl streak under the coaching of Chan Gailey in 2007.  Despite this accomplishment, Georgia Tech terminated Gailey the Monday following his sixth loss to archrival University of Georgia. No coach in Georgia Tech history had ever lost six straight to the Bulldogs before Gailey. Gailey failed to finish the season in the Top 25 all six of his head coaching seasons and posted a 12–12 record in November. Gailey's career ended at Georgia Tech with an overall record of 44–31.

Pre-season
Paul Johnson is the new head coach of the Yellow Jackets after posting a 45–29 record at the United States Naval Academy since 2002. Johnson also recorded a 7–1 record in the Commander-in-Chief's Trophy against the Air Force and Army.

Johnson will be installing his option offense at Georgia Tech. In response, 2007 starting QB Taylor Bennett transferred to Louisiana Tech, opening up the 2008 QB job for sophomore Josh Nesbitt and freshman Jaybo Shaw. The Georgia Tech offense returns two of its top four receivers in Greg Smith and Demaryius Thomas, and the Tech defense returns defensive end Michael Johnson and primary interior linemen Darryl Richard and Vance Walker.

In June 2008, former University of Louisville RB Anthony Allen announced he will be transferring to Georgia Tech.  Due to NCAA transfer rules, he will be required to sit out the 2008 football season.

Rankings

Schedule

Game summaries

Jacksonville State
Pregame Line: Jacksonville State +27.5

Georgia Tech ran for 349 yards in the season opener against Jacksonville State.  The team was led by Jon Dwyer's 113 yards rushing and pair of touchdown runs.  Josh Nesbitt scored two additional rushing touchdowns in the rout.  The game featured former Louisiana State University quarterback Ryan Perrilloux who transferred to Jacksonville State after the 2007 football season.  Perrilloux led the Gamecocks on their two second-half touchdown drives, but was intercepted twice by Tech safety Morgan Burnett.  The Tech defense also added four sacks in the effort.  Tech has not lost to an I-AA opponent since its September 17, 1983, game against the Furman Paladins.

Boston College
Pregame Line: Boston College −7.5

Georgia Tech overcame a fourth quarter deficit and three lost fumbles to defeat the Boston College Eagles 19–16.  The Jackets were led by the running of sophomores Jon Dwyer and Josh Nesbitt.  The two combined for all but 8 yards of Georgia Tech's 235 yards of offense.  Dwyer added 93 yards of kick returns to his 109 yards rushing.  Dwyer scored the go ahead touchdown on a 43-yard run with less than 9 minutes remaining in the game.  Georgia Tech's defense sacked first year starter Chris Crane three times in the game and forced three turnovers.  Tech remained undefeated all time in Chestnut Hill with the win.

Virginia Tech
Pregame Line: Virginia Tech −7

The Hokies needed a penalty-aided, fourth quarter drive to put away the Jackets in 20–17 loss for Georgia Tech, the first loss of the season for GT. On Virginia Tech's second to last possession, the Hokies only managed 38 yards of offense but with key defensive penalties moved the ball 76 yards to the Georgia Tech 4 yard line and kicked the go ahead field goal with 4:37 remaining on the game clock.  Georgia Tech rushed for 278 yards in the game, led by quarterback Josh Nesbitt's 151 yards and slotback Lucas Cox's 63 yards.  Nesbitt also added 109 yards passing with a 41-yard touchdown strike to slotback Roddy Jones followed by a two-point conversion.  The Tech defense held VT to only 48 yards passing but gave up 200 yards on the ground.  Safety Morgan Burnett added 13 tackles to his total for the season increasing his average to 9 tackles per game for the season.  Michael Johnson and Derrick Morgan combined for Tech's lone sack on Virginia Tech QB Tyrod Taylor.  ABC took a 6-day option on the time of the Mississippi State gametime and with the loss relegated Tech's home game to a 12:00 pm EST time slot the following week.

Mississippi State
Pregame Line: Mississippi St. +8

Georgia Tech scored 38 straight points against the Mississippi State Bulldogs to cruise to a 38–7 victory at home.  The offense was led by the rushing effort of Jon Dwyer who accumulated 141 yards, a rushing touchdown, and a school record 88 yard touchdown run in the third quarter.  True freshman Jaybo Shaw substituted for injured quarterback Josh Nesbitt in the first quarter and would finish the game with 106 total yards, a passing touchdown, and a rushing touchdown.  The Georgia Tech defense bent but did not break allowing 407 yards of offense but giving up only 7 points, the lowest point allowance of the season.  The defense picked off two Mississippi State passes, recovered two fumbles, and accumulated three quarterback sacks.  Michael Johnson along with his sack blocked an 18-yard field goal attempt in the first quarter.  With the win, Georgia Tech has gone 6–8 against the Southeastern Conference since 2000.

Duke
Pregame Line: Duke +14

Georgia Tech started true freshman Jaybo Shaw at quarterback for ailing Josh Nesbitt and rolled over Duke 27–0.  Shaw passed for 230 yards and a touchdown all to one receiver sophomore Demaryius Thomas.  Thomas caught one pass for a career long 88 yards.  Jon Dwyer and Roddy Jones added balance to the Georgia Tech offense accumulating 203 yards on 33 carries.  Jones scored Tech's lone rushing touchdown.  Georgia Tech's defense held Duke's offense to 0 points and 132 yards after Duke averaged 31 points and 373 yards per game coming into the contest.  Tech defenders racked up two sacks and an interception.  This was the twenty-sixth shutdown since 1961 for Georgia Tech.  The last shutout for a Georgia Tech defense was the 2006 North Carolina game in which Tech won 7–0 and clinched the Coastal Division seat in the ACC Championship Game.

Gardner-Webb
Pregame Line: Off the board

Gardner-Webb's attempt at the upset fell short when the game-tying field goal with 9 seconds remaining was partially blocked by sophomore defensive end Derrick Morgan.  Third string redshirt senior Calvin Booker received the starting nod from Paul Johnson before the game to rest ailing quarterbacks Josh Nesbitt and Jaybo Shaw. Tech's worst offensive showing of the season saw Tech only accumulate 79 yards on the ground and give away three turnovers.  The lone offensive highlight being a 79-yard touchdown reception by Jon Dwyer in the second quarter.  Tech's defense held the Runnin' Bulldogs until 8:25 in the third quarter, in which the Bulldogs marched 69 yards down the field for their lone score.  The Tech defense racked up 6 sacks and an interception.

Clemson
Pregame Line: Clemson +2

On October 13, Clemson head coach Tommy Bowden was fired and was replaced by receivers coach Dabo Swinney.  Tech's defense controlled the ebb and flow of the game forcing six turnovers, which included four interceptions and two fumble recoveries.  Safety Dominique Reese returned an intercepted pass from wide receiver Tyler Grisham for Tech's first touchdown.  Morgan Burnett added two additional interceptions, the final in the last second of the game.  Offensively, Tech continued to produce with its ground game against the Tigers racking up 207 yards rushing.  Josh Nesbitt ran untouched for 5 yards for Tech's second score and passed 24 yards to Demaryius Thomas for Tech's go ahead and eventual game winning score.  Tech is 6–1 for the first time since 1999.

Virginia
Pregame Line: Virginia +11

Georgia Tech dropped its first homecoming decision in thirteen years ending a twelve-game win streak that dates back to 1995.  The Cavaliers were aided by three Georgia Tech turnovers.  The Georgia Tech defense struggled to contain the Cavaliers giving up almost 400 yards of offense and the most points allowed all season.  Tech highlights, however, included two interceptions by the defense and a recovered fumble.  Slotback Roddy Jones had a career day with 169 all purpose yards including 75 yards rushing on 11 carries.  Tech heads into the Florida State game a half game behind Virginia and a half game ahead of Virginia Tech, Miami, and UNC in the ACC Coastal Division race.

Florida State
Pregame Line: Florida St. +2.5

Georgia Tech had not defeated Florida State since 1975.  The twelve-game losing streak that dated back to 1992 that included three head coaching tenures ended with a 31–28 victory for Georgia Tech.  Georgia Tech appeared to have the game clearly in hand until Josh Nesbitt injured his foot with 7:42 remaining in the 3rd quarter.  Backup Jaybo Shaw assumed control of the offense and the offense only managed 8 yards of offense in the remaining one and a half quarters.  Florida State closed the score differential to 31–28 and drove all the way to the Georgia Tech 3 yard line with 1:20 remaining in the game.  On second down, the FSU running back lost control of the football after Safety Cooper Taylor hit the ball with his helmet.  Tech's Rashaad Reid recovered the football in the end zone and with two proceeding quarterback kneels ended the dramatic victory.  Jon Dwyer added 145 yards rushing and two touchdowns, Roddy Jones added 118 all purpose yards, and starter Josh Nesbitt added 116 additional all purpose yards to the offensive effort.  The Tech defense sacked FSU quarterbacks 5 times and forced 3 turnovers.  Tech took a half-game lead in the division race with the win.  Some refer to the game as the "Miracle on North Avenue," as it ended Georgia Tech's 12 meeting losing run to the Seminoles, and the first time the Yellow Jackets had ever beaten legendary Coach Bobby Bowden since he came to FSU.

North Carolina
Pregame Line: North Carolina −4.5

In Georgia Tech's worst offensive showing of the season Tech gave up 3 turnovers and lost 28–7 in Chapel Hill.  The defense held UNC's offense in check until the fourth quarter in which a muffed punt, a fumble, and an interception led to three consecutive Tarheel touchdowns.  Tech's lone offensive highlight was an 85-yard touchdown run by Jon Dwyer, which was the longest touchdown run recorded against an UNC defense ever.  Dwyer's effort for the day put him over 1,000 yards for the season.  Tech's defense was led by Michael Johnson who accumulated 6 tackles and sack in the losing effort.

Miami
Pregame Line: Miami +3.5

Georgia Tech has defeated Miami four consecutive years joining Alabama, Florida, Florida State, Kentucky, Notre Dame, and Virginia Tech as the only schools to defeat Miami in four consecutive years.  Georgia Tech led by as much as 24 and never relented the lead over the Canes as the Tech offense racked up 472 yards rushing.  The defense picked off two Miami passes including one by defensive end Michael Johnson, which was returned for the first touchdown of the game.  Tech's victory put them in first place in the Coastal Division.  Georgia Tech needs Virginia, Virginia Tech, and North Carolina to lose at least one more game to end all tie breaking scenarios.  Also of note, the game was dubbed a "White Out" by the Georgia Tech Athletic Association and fans were encouraged to wear white to the game.

Georgia
Pregame Line: Georgia −7

Source: 
    
    
    
    
    
    
    
    
    
    
    
    
    

On the strength of a third quarter offensive explosion, Georgia Tech bested Georgia in Athens 45–42.  Tech was led by the rushing efforts of Roddy Jones and Jon Dwyer who were major contributors to Tech's 410 total rushing yards.  Jones alone contributed 299 all-purpose yards in the effort.  The win ended a seven-year losing streak to the Bulldogs and preserved Tech coach Bobby Dodd's series record eight-game winning streak that ran from 1949–1956.

Chick-fil-A Bowl

Pregame Line: LSU +4

A 28-point 2nd quarter by LSU was too much for the Jackets to overcome in the 2008 Chick-fil-A Bowl rout.  Tech gave up three turnovers and did not force any.  Tech passed 24 times in the game and accumulated 150 yards of passing offense alongside 164 yards of rushing offense.  Tech's offense was led by Jon Dwyer's 123 all purpose yards.  Tech's defense was led by Morgan Burnett.  Burnett had 14 total tackles and 1.5 tackles for loss.  Senior Michael Johnson added two sacks to Tech's effort.

Postseason awards

Roster

References

Georgia Tech
Georgia Tech Yellow Jackets football seasons
Georgia Tech Yellow Jackets football